Golden Needles (also released under the title The Chase for the Golden Needles) is a 1974 American action/adventure film starring Joe Don Baker, Elizabeth Ashley, Ann Sothern, Jim Kelly, Burgess Meredith, and Roy Chiao. The film was directed by Robert Clouse and shot on location in Hong Kong.

Plot
A legendary statue has seven gold needles inserted in it, and an adult man will become a sexual superman when the needles are placed in the same position in his body. A colorful group of characters is all in on the hunt for the mysterious statue.

Cast
 Joe Don Baker as Dan
 Elizabeth Ashley as Felicity
 Ann Sothern as Fenzie
 Jim Kelly as Jeff
 Burgess Meredith as Winters

Soundtrack

The soundtrack, composed and conducted by Lalo Schifrin, was released on Music Box Records label (website).

Sources

See also
 List of American films of 1974

External links
 
 
 
 

1974 films
1970s action adventure films
American International Pictures films
Films directed by Robert Clouse
Films shot in Hong Kong
American martial arts films
Films scored by Lalo Schifrin
American action adventure films
1974 martial arts films
1970s English-language films
1970s American films